Clock Cleaners is a 1937 American animated short film produced by Walt Disney Productions and released by RKO Radio Pictures. The cartoon follows Mickey Mouse, Donald Duck, and Goofy working as janitors in a tall clock tower. The film was directed by Ben Sharpsteen and features original music by Paul Smith and Oliver Wallace. The voice cast includes Walt Disney as Mickey, Clarence Nash as Donald, and Pinto Colvig as Goofy. It was the 97th short in the Mickey Mouse film series to be released, and the eighth for that year.

Clock Cleaners is one of Disney's most critically acclaimed short films. In 1994, 1000 members of the animation field voted Clock Cleaners as the 27th greatest cartoon of all time. This cartoon was released two months before Snow White and the Seven Dwarfs (1937).

Plot
Mickey, Donald, and Goofy are assigned to clean a tall clock tower in a city. Mickey is outside cleaning the face with a mop by riding on the second hand. Goofy is inside the building cleaning gear teeth with a large toothbrush. Donald (singing "Hickory Dickory Dock") starts to mop the mainspring, ignoring several warning signs. He gets the mop caught and springs it loose.

Meanwhile, Mickey, now cleaning inside the clock, comes across a sleeping stork which he tries unsuccessfully to remove. As he throws the stork out of the tower, it flies back in and snatches Mickey, carrying him as if he were a baby, then letting go of Mickey before flying back in, leaving him hanging on a rope as water from the bucket falls on his head.

Back inside, Donald is getting the mainspring back into place with a mallet, but he struggles to get the very last piece in place. The loose end of the spring taps Donald and when he shouts at it, the spring responds with an echo of his words. After a brief argument, Donald loses his temper and hits the spring with the mallet, but it sends it back and knocks him off. Donald gets his head stuck in a gear on the balance wheel shaft, and when he finally is free from it, the oscillation makes his body continue to move.

Now outside, Goofy, singing "Asleep in the Deep", is cleaning the outside bell. As he is cleaning the interior of the bell, it becomes 4:00 PM, causing two mechanical statues to come from inside the tower and ring the bell by taking turns striking it, for a total of four times. The first figure, representing Father Time, approaches without Goofy noticing. When the bell rings with Goofy inside it, his head vibrates violently and he sits down. Before he has regained his composure the statue has returned to the tower, and he then looks around suspiciously and says "Mice!" The second figure, representing Lady Liberty, rings the bell from the other side and he is once again vibrated. After the second ring, Goofy is determined to be ready for the next time. As the bell is struck a third time, he leaps out and is ready to attack, but when he sees Lady Liberty coming for the fourth ring, he idiotically apologizes and bows. But then the Liberty figure's torch arm drops and gives Goofy a big knock to the head, putting him in a lovestruck daze. Mickey is alarmed when he sees Goofy almost fall and tries to save him. At each turn, Mickey is just barely able to save Goofy. At last, Goofy lands on a flag pole that sends him and Mickey to fly through a window into the clock, land on the mainspring which Donald had finally managed to put back together, undoing all the springs again, then all three land in the same gear in which Donald was stuck earlier, causing their bodies to move in a humorous rhythm.

Cast
Walt Disney as Mickey Mouse
Clarence Nash as Donald Duck
Pinto Colvig as Goofy
 Jimmy MacDonald as Spring

Controversy 

During the 1990s, Donald Wildmon and his fundamentalist Christian organization the American Family Association persuaded Wal-Mart to discontinue the sale of the VHS tape Cartoon Classics: Fun on the Job!, which included Clock Cleaners, due to two perceived uses of inappropriate language by Donald Duck. During his fight with the mainspring Donald responds to the taunting spring by saying  "Says who!?" (which is made clear by the spring replying, "Says I!") and then threatens the mainspring, calling it a "snake in the grass". However, due to Donald's unintelligible "duck voice", some believed that he was instead saying "f*** you" to the mainspring and calling it a "son of a b***h".

Due to this controversy, when the film was released on the Walt Disney Treasures DVD set Mickey Mouse in Living Color (2001), Donald's "Says who?" line was redubbed with the line "Aw, nuts!", originally from the On Ice soundtrack. The edit is made obvious by the sound of Pluto barking in the background. The "snake in the grass" line was also redubbed. The same edits occur on several later DVD releases, including The Great Mouse Detective (2002) which included the cartoon as a bonus feature in reference to that film's climactic battle in and around Big Ben, Funny Factory with Goofy (2006), and the bonus Epic Mickey DVD (2010).

Other DVD releases have kept the original line, such as Alice in Wonderland: Masterpiece Edition (2004) which included the cartoon as part of the TV special "One Hour in Wonderland", and Have a Laugh!: Volume 2 (2010) which also included the film's original RKO title cards. More recent broadcasts of the cartoon on Disney Channel have also included the original line.

On Disney+, the "says who?" line is restored, though the "snake in the grass" line is still replaced with angry gibberish.

In the 1980s, Mickey struggling to shove the stork out of the clock tower was deleted, due to time constraints.

Releases
1937 – theatrical release
1950 – One Hour in Wonderland (TV)
1972 – The Mouse Factory, episode #15: "Back to Nature" (TV)
c. 1983 – Good Morning, Mickey!, episode #56 (TV)
1986 – theatrical re-release with The Great Mouse Detective
1990 – "Goofy's Guide to Success" (TV)
c. 1992 – Mickey's Mouse Tracks, episode #77 (TV)
c. 1992 – Donald's Quack Attack, episode #60 (TV)
1997 – The Ink and Paint Club, episode #1.22: "Classic Mickey" (TV)
2010 – Have a Laugh!, episode #7 (TV)

Home media
The short was released on December 4, 2001, on Walt Disney Treasures: Mickey Mouse in Living Color.

Additional releases include:
1984 – "Cartoon Classics: Mickey's Crazy Careers" (VHS)
1992 – "Cartoon Classics - Special Edition: Fun on the Job!" (VHS)
2002 – Bonus on DVD of The Great Mouse Detective (DVD)
2006 – "Funny Factory with Goofy" (DVD)
2010 – "Have a Laugh! Volume Two" (DVD)
2019 – Disney+

See also
Mickey Mouse (film series)

References

External links 
 
 
 

1937 animated films
1937 films
1930s color films
1930s Disney animated short films
Film controversies
Mickey Mouse short films
Films directed by Ben Sharpsteen
Films produced by Walt Disney
Films scored by Oliver Wallace
Films scored by Paul Smith (film and television composer)
Disney controversies
Clocks in fiction
Censored films
1930s American films